The Grasshopper Cup 2014 is the 2014's Grasshopper Cup, which is a tournament of the PSA World Tour event International (Prize money : 50 000 $). The event took place at the EWZ-Unterwerk Selnau in Zurich in Switzerland from 23 to 27 April. Amr Shabana won his first Grasshopper Cup trophy, beating Tarek Momen in the final.

Prize money and ranking points
For 2014, the prize purse was $50,000. The prize money and points breakdown is as follows:

Seeds

Draw and results

See also
PSA World Tour 2014
Grasshopper Cup

References

External links
PSA Grasshopper Cup 2014 website 
Grasshopper Cup 2014 official website

Squash tournaments in Switzerland
Sport in Zürich
www.gc-cup.com index.php?id=gc-cup-home
2014 in Swiss sport